The 2015–16 season is Parma Calcio 1913's first season in the Serie D since 1969-70. After having been declared bankrupt and relegated from Serie A at the end of the 2014–15 season. 
The team competed in 2015–16 Serie D and the 2015–16 Coppa Italia Serie D. Parma finished the season in first place, immediately promoted to Lega Pro.

Players

Squad information

As of 24 February 2016

Out on loan

League table

Coppa Italia Serie D

References

Parma Calcio 1913 seasons
Parma